Mason Township is one of the fourteen townships of Lawrence County, Ohio, United States. As of the 2010 census, the population was 1,116.

Geography
Located in the northeastern part of the county, it borders the following townships:
Walnut Township, Gallia County - north
Harrison Township, Gallia County - northeast corner
Guyan Township, Gallia County - east
Rome Township - southeast corner
Windsor Township - south
Lawrence Township - southwest corner
Aid Township - west
Symmes Township - northwest corner

No municipalities are located in Mason Township. Established before 1873, Arabia is a populated place in the township. Yarico is also a populated place in the township.

Name and history
It is the only Mason Township statewide.

Government
The township is governed by a three-member board of trustees, who are elected in November of odd-numbered years to a four-year term beginning on the following January 1. Two are elected in the year after the presidential election and one is elected in the year before it. There is also an elected township fiscal officer, who serves a four-year term beginning on April 1 of the year after the election, which is held in November of the year before the presidential election. Vacancies in the fiscal officership or on the board of trustees are filled by the remaining trustees.

References

External links
County website

Townships in Lawrence County, Ohio
Townships in Ohio